Chase Andrew Boone (born September 21, 1995) is an American soccer player who plays as a forward for Monterey Bay F.C. in the USL Championship.

Career

College & PDL
In 2014, Boone attended the University of Redlands to play college soccer. Over four seasons with the Bulldogs, Boone made 88 appearances, scoring 34 goals and tallying 25 assists. He also earned accolades including been named to the NSCAA All-West Region Team, All-SCIAC First-Team honors on consecutive occasions, and was named on the SCIAC All-Academic Men’s Soccer Team.

During the 2017 season, Boone also appeared for USL PDL side Portland Timbers U23, making two appearances for the club.

Professional
In 2019 Boone signed with third-tier Danish 2nd Division side Thisted, where he played for two seasons.

On July 24, 2021, it was announced Boone had returned to the United States and signed for USL Championship side San Diego Loyal. He made his debut the same day, appearing as a 70th-minute substitute during a 1–0 loss to Phoenix Rising.

On January 27, 2022, Boone was announced as the third player to sign for USL Championship expansion side Monterey Bay FC. Boone was included in the starting 11 for Monterey Bay's inaugural match, a 4-2 loss to Phoenix Rising FC. Boone scored his first and second goals for the club during the first win in Monterey Bay FC history, a 3-2 victory over Oakland Roots SC. Boone finished the season with eight goals, tied for Monterey Bay's golden boot with teammate Sam Gleadle. Prior to the 2023 season, Boone's contract with Monterey Bay was extended through the 2024 USL Championship season.

References

1995 births
American expatriate soccer players
American expatriate sportspeople in Denmark
American soccer players
Association football forwards
Danish 2nd Division players
Expatriate men's footballers in Denmark
Living people
People from Beaverton, Oregon
Portland Timbers U23s players
San Diego Loyal SC players
Soccer players from Oregon
Thisted FC players
USL Championship players
USL League Two players
Redlands Bulldogs athletes
College men's soccer players in the United States
Monterey Bay FC players